The men's 5000 metres speed skating competition of the 2010 Winter Olympics in Vancouver was held at the Richmond Olympic Oval on 13 February 2010.

Records
Prior to this competition, the existing world and Olympic records were as follows.

The following new Olympic record was set during this competition.

OR = Olympic record

Results

References

External links
 

Men's speed skating at the 2010 Winter Olympics